Six vessels of the Royal Navy have been named HMS Havock, including:

 was a 12-gun gun-brig launched in 1805. She became a lightvessel in 1821, a watch vessel in 1834 and was broken up in 1859.
 was a mortar vessel launched in 1855, and renamed MV5 later that year. She became a customs watch vessel  designated WV27, and was broken up in 1874.
 was an  wooden screw gunboat launched in 1856 and sold in 1870.
 was a  launched in 1893, becoming the first design of torpedo boat destroyers in the Navy. She was broken up in 1912.
HMS Havock was to have been a  destroyer, but was renamed  before being launched in 1913.
 was an H-class destroyer launched in 1936 and wrecked in 1942 off Kelibia.

See also
HMS Havick

Royal Navy ship names